Culley is a given name. Notable people with the name include:

Culley C. Carson III (born 1945), American urologist
Culley Rikard (1914–2000), American baseball player

See also

 Culley (surname)
Curley